Dasht-e Jam Rural District is a rural district (dehestan) in Bujgan District, Torbat-e Jam County, Razavi Khorasan Province, Iran. At the 2006 census, its population was 7,296, in 1,498 families.  The rural district has 6 villages.

References 

Rural Districts of Razavi Khorasan Province
Torbat-e Jam County